Valparaiso is Rita Connolly's second solo recording, released in 1996. It features a guest appearance by Iarla O'Lionaird on vocals.

Track listing
"Ocean Floor"–4:55 (S. Condell)
"Valparaiso"–3:57 (R. Connolly)
"Lizzie Finn"–5:10 (S. Barry, S. Davey)
"Ripples In The Rockpools"–3:27 (S. Davey)
"Piccadilly"–4:46 (Leo O'Kelly)
"His Name Is Elvis"–3:18 (S. Barry, S. Davey)
"Two White Horses"–2:39 (S. Condell)
"Shakin' The Blues Away"–2:33 (Irving Berlin)
"Sun Song"–3:51 (R. Connolly, S. Davey)
"Rio"–4:48 (Michael Nesmith)
"The Great Guns Roarv"–4:00 (S. Davey)
"The Quiet Land of Erin"–3:36 (J O'Hara, S. Davey)

Personnel
 Rita Connolly - Vocals. 
 Iarla O'Lionaird - Vocals. 
 Shaun Davey - Harmony vocals.
 Robbie Brennan & Paul McAteer - Drums.
 Noel Eccles - Percussion.
 Eoghan O'Neill - Bass guitars.
 Des Moore - Acoustic & electric guitar, High String Guitar & Mandolin.
 Anthony Drennan - Lead electric guitar, Dobro, Acoustic guitar, E-Bow electric.
 Jimmy Smith - Lead electric guitar.
 Gerry O'Beirne - Acoustic guitar.
 Paul Drennan & Eddie Lynch - Keyboards.
 Michael Buckley - Soprano & Tenor Sax, Flute.
 Matthew Manning - Oboe, Cor Anglais.
 Backing Vocals/Chorus: Sean Connolly, Patricia Connolly, Enda Connolly, Inez Connolly, Ursula Connolly, Clare Kenny, Carla Gallagher, Valerie Armstrong and Steve Cooney.

Production
 Produced by Shaun Davey.
 Co-Produced by Rita Connolly.
 Engineered & mixed by Bill Somerville-Large
 Additional engineering - Andrew Boland & Brian Masterson.
 Assistant Engineer - Conan Doyle.
 Executive Producer - John Cook.
 Computer Programming - Dennis Woods.
 Recorded at Westland Studios & Windmill Lane Studios, Dublin.

References

External links
 Album sleevenotes
 Record Label Catalogue 2010

Rita Connolly albums
1996 albums